Berlin-Baumschulenweg is a railway station in the Treptow-Köpenick district of Berlin, served by the S-Bahn lines , , , ,  and .

References

Baumschulenweg
Railway stations in Treptow-Köpenick
Railway stations in Germany opened in 1890
1890 establishments in Prussia